Anka Wachana (Quechua anka black-chested buzzard-eagle or eagle, wacha birth, to give birth -na a suffix, "where the eagle is born", Hispanicized spelling Ancahuachana) is a mountain  in the Andes of Peru. Anka Wachana is situated in the Cusco Region, Chumbivilcas Province, Velille District.

References 

Mountains of Peru
Mountains of Cusco Region